Annoying Orange is an American comedy series created by former Minnesota film student and MTV production assistant Dane Boedigheimer on October 9, 2009. It stars its creator as an anthropomorphic orange who annoys other fruits, vegetables, and various other food and objects by using jokes and puns which are sometimes crude. As of July 2, 2021, 673 episodes of Annoying Orange have been released.

Despite the show's negative critical reception, the show's popularity after its first episode led to it becoming the subject of a TV series, a video game, a range of toys and a T-shirt line.

Series overview

Episodes

Season 1 (2009)

Season 2 (2010)

Season 3 (2011)

Season 4 (2012)

Season 5 (2013)

Season 6 (2014)

Season 7 (2015)

Season 8 (2016)

Season 9 (2017)

Season 10 (2018)

Season 11 (2019)

Season 12 (2020)

Season 13 (2021)

Season 14 (2022)

Season 15 (2023)

References

External links
Official Annoying Orange website
Official Annoying Orange channel on YouTube
Annoying Orange show page on YouTube

Annoying Orange
The Annoying Orange